Hyaloklossia is a genus of parasitic alveolates in the phylum Apicomplexa. Only one species in this genus is currently recognised - Hyaloklossia lieberkuehni.

History

This parasites of this genus was first observed by Lieberkuhn in 1854 within the renal cortex of a frog of the genus Rana. Labbe in 1894 initially named this species Klossia lieberkuehni. Labbe in 1896 moved this species to a new genus Hyaloklossia.

Laveran and Mesnil in 1902 and Minchin in 1903 moved this species into the genus Diplospora Labbe 1893. It was moved again into the genus Isospora  by Noller in 1923.

The species was replaced in the genus Hyaloklossia by Modry et al. in 2001.

Description

There are two sporocysts within the ocysts. The oocysts have a thin, elastic, relatively fragile wall.

The sporocysts are tetrazoic. The sporocyst wall is composed of plates joined by sutures and Stieda and substieda bodies are absent.

The life cycle is homoxenous.

Endogenous development is extraintestinal (renal). Sporulation of oocysts is endogenous.

Life cycle 

The sporocysts are released from the renal epithelial cells and are passed with the urine into the water.

It is presumed that they are subsequently ingested, decyst within the gut, invade the gut wall and migrate to the renal cortex.

The parasites grow with the renal epithelial cells and give rise to male and female gamonts which are released into the lumen of the tubule where they meet and fuse forming an oocyte. The oocyte subsequently develops into an oocyst which in turn divides into two sporocysts.

Host record

The only known host of this species is the European green frog (Rana esculenta).

References 

Apicomplexa genera

zh:孢子蟲屬